Kristen Gutoskie is a Canadian actress. She is known for her roles as Katie Frank in Containment, Rachael in Beaver Falls, Seline in The Vampire Diaries and Molly Hendricks in Lethal Weapon.

Biography

Kristen Gutoskie has been an actress, singer and dancer since the age of 12. She grew up in the suburbs of Toronto with her mother, a nurse, her father, a computer salesman and her older sister. She skipped classes in school because she thought it was "cool". During her youth, she won many competitions as a solo singer and competed with many dance groups.

She began working in theater, television and film. She completed an Honors Arts Degree at Wilfrid Laurier University where she took hip-hop classes in her spare time. During her senior year, she traveled as an exchange student to Australia, New Zealand, Europe and South Africa. Following her travels, she moved to Los Angeles. She has appeared in productions on networks such as E4, ABC, A&E, The CW, CBC and Global TV2. She has also appeared in numerous independent films. She writes music, sings and volunteers in her spare time. She has developed her own non-profit campaign.

Filmography

References

External links
 
 
 Official website

Living people
Canadian film actresses
21st-century Canadian actresses
Canadian television actresses
Year of birth missing (living people)